Made in Stoke 24/7/11 is the second live album by British-American hard rock guitarist Slash. Featuring American vocalist Myles Kennedy, the album was recorded on Slash's debut solo tour in Stoke-on-Trent, where Slash spent his early years. It was captured at the 1500 capacity Victoria Hall on 24 July 2011 and released by Armoury Records, a division of Eagle Rock Entertainment, on 14 November 2011 as a live album and DVD/Blu-ray, featuring 5.1-channel surround sound. As well as songs from Slash's self-titled debut album, Made in Stoke also includes songs originally performed by the guitarist's previous bands Guns N' Roses, Slash's Snakepit and Velvet Revolver.

Track listing

Personnel

Musicians
Slash – lead guitar, talkbox, slide guitar
Myles Kennedy – lead vocals, rhythm guitar on "Nothing to Say" and "Watch This"
Bobby Schneck – rhythm guitar, backing vocals
Todd Kerns – bass, backing vocals, lead vocals on "Doctor Alibi"
Brent Fitz – drums

Additional personnel
Audrey Davenport – production
Eric Valentine – mixing, mastering
Matt Friedman – production assistance
Ian Dyckhoff – engineering
Cian Riordan – mixing assistance 
Ian Van Der Molen – mixing assistance

References

Slash (musician) albums
2011 live albums
2011 video albums
Live video albums